The NWA Americas Tag Team Championship was a professional wrestling tag team title in the National Wrestling Alliance's NWA Hollywood Wrestling based out of Los Angeles, California.

The championship began as the WWA World Tag Team Championship for Worldwide Wrestling Associates in 1964. However, when WWA became an NWA affiliate on October 1, 1968, its name was changed to NWA Hollywood Wrestling and the title was renamed the NWA Americas Tag Team Championship in January 1969. The title served as the top tag team championship in the promotion until 1979 when it was relegated to serve as a secondary tag title since the company created its own regional version of the NWA World Tag Team Championship. The championship lasted until the promotion closed on December 26, 1982.

Title history

See also 
 National Wrestling Alliance
 NWA Americas Heavyweight Championship

References

External links 
 WWA World Tag Team Championship and NWA Americas Tag Team Championship histories at Wrestling-Titles.com

National Wrestling Alliance championships
NWA Hollywood Wrestling championships
Tag team wrestling championships
Regional professional wrestling championships